Straumsnes Church is a parish church of the Church of Norway in Tingvoll Municipality in Møre og Romsdal county, Norway. It is located in the village of Straumsnes. It is the main church for the Straumsnes parish which is part of the Indre Nordmøre prosti (deanery) in the Diocese of Møre. The white, wooden church was built in a long church style in 1864 by the architect Gustav Olsen. The church seats about 300 people.

History
The parish of Straumsnes was established by royal resolution on 14 January 1863. Soon after, plans were made for a new church to be built for the parish. The church was designed by Gustav Olsen (who also designed the nearby Øre Church), and the lead builder during the construction was Lars Thoresen. The church was built in 1863-1864 and it was consecrated on 7 October 1864. In 1946, a baptismal sacristy was added. The church was damaged by a lightning strike in 2006 and it had to be restored afterwards.

See also
List of churches in Møre

References

Tingvoll
Churches in Møre og Romsdal
Long churches in Norway
Wooden churches in Norway
19th-century Church of Norway church buildings
Churches completed in 1864
1864 establishments in Norway